An election for the Berwick-upon-Tweed Borough Council was held on 4 May 1995.  The Liberal Democrats and Independents won twelve seats each, becoming the joint-biggest groups and forcing the council to stay under no overall control. The whole council was up for election, and turnout was 48.5%.

Election result

See also 
Berwick-upon-Tweed Borough Council elections

References 

District council elections in England
Council elections in Northumberland